Gerald Coleman (born April 3, 1985) is an American former professional ice hockey goaltender who played in the National Hockey League for the Tampa Bay Lightning. He predominantly played in the minor leagues, most notably with the Alaska Aces of the ECHL.

Playing career
Coleman was drafted 224th overall by the Tampa Bay Lightning in the 2003 NHL Entry Draft. Selected from the London Knights of the Ontario Hockey League, Coleman was awarded the Dave Pinkney Trophy on his way to capturing the Memorial Cup the following season in 2003–04. He is the first graduate of the NHL Diversity Program to be drafted and to play in the NHL, making his debut for the Lightning, in relief, on November 11, 2005.

On February 24, 2007, Coleman was traded with a 1st round draft pick to the Anaheim Ducks for Shane O'Brien and a 3rd round draft pick. He was then assigned to the Ducks AHL affiliate, the Portland Pirates.

Coleman attended the Chicago Wolves training camp for the 2008–09 season, before he was released. After starting the year in the ECHL with the Phoenix RoadRunners, Coleman was recalled to the Worcester Sharks but upon his return was traded to the Trenton Devils on November 21, 2008. Coleman was then credited as a major influence in the turn around Trenton Devils season going 27-8-2 for the remainder of the year.

Coleman was then invited to the New Jersey Devils training camp for the 2009–10 before he was reassigned to AHL affiliate, the Lowell Devils. Coleman appeared in just three games with Lowell before he returned to Trenton for the season.

After attending the St. Louis Blues training camp, Coleman played the 2010–11 season with the Alaska Aces, posting a 2.19 GAA and a save percentage of .913, earning a record of 30-15-1-0 with 4 shutouts. In the Kelly Cup Playoffs, Coleman, along with the rest of the Aces set a playoff record with a 12-1 record to capture the cup. Coleman earned 11 of those 12 wins and did so with a .938 save percentage and a 1.73 GAA and 3 shutouts. In the end, Coleman lead the Alaska Aces win their second Brabham Cup and second Kelly Cup in franchise history. The Alaska Aces are also the only team to win the Brabham Cup and Kelly cup in the same year twice. He also captured goaltender of the year.

Coleman returned to the Aces the following season and after 23 games was signed to a professional try-out by the Lake Erie Monsters of the AHL. Coleman enjoyed a prominent role with the Monsters, winning 11 of 17 games before returning to the Aces to finish a second consecutive year with the lowest goals against average in the ECHL.

With off-season surgery and a forecasted lengthy recovery limiting interest from the AHL, Coleman re-signed with the Aces for his third season with the club on July 12, 2012.

After his fourth season with the Aces, and backstopping the club to their second Kelly Cup Championship in his successful tenure, Coleman retired from professional hockey due to persisting hip injuries on August 1, 2014. He intended to pursue studies in physical therapy.

Career statistics

Awards and honors

References

External links

1985 births
African-American ice hockey players
Alaska Aces (ECHL) players
American men's ice hockey goaltenders
Augusta Lynx players
Johnstown Chiefs players
Lake Erie Monsters players
Living people
London Knights players
Lowell Devils players
People from Romeoville, Illinois
Phoenix RoadRunners players
Portland Pirates players
Springfield Falcons players
Tampa Bay Lightning draft picks
Tampa Bay Lightning players
Trenton Devils players
Worcester Sharks players
Ice hockey players from Illinois
USA Hockey National Team Development Program players
21st-century African-American sportspeople
20th-century African-American people